Yeongdong County is a county in North Chungcheong Province, South Korea.  The county should not be confused with the similarly named Yeongdong region.

During the Korean War, this county was the site of the No Gun Ri Massacre.

Climate
Yeongdong has a humid continental climate (Köppen: Dwa), but can be considered a borderline humid subtropical climate (Köppen: Cwa) using the  isotherm.

Tourist spot
8 Scenic Sites of Hancheon
 Wollyu-bong
 Sanyang-byeok
 Cheonghak-gul
 Yongyeon-dae
 Naengcheon-jeong
 Beopjon-am
 Sagung-bong
 Hwaeon-ak

Twin towns – sister cities

Yeongdong is twinned with:

Domestic
 Seodaemun-gu, Seoul
 Yongsan-gu, Seoul
 Gangnam-gu, Seoul
 Osan, Gyeonggi

International
  Fangchenggang, Guangxi, China
  Dumaguete, Philippines

See also
Geography of South Korea

References

External links
Yeongdong County government home page (in English)
Yeongdong County government home page (in Korean)

 
Counties of North Chungcheong Province